Live From Mount Olympus is a podcast produced by Public Radio Exchange and the Alexander S. Onassis Foundation. The show stars André De Shields as Hermes. The second season stars Joanne Hernandez as Persephone. Common Sense Media gave the show a five star rating for ages eight and up. The show was nominated for a Webby Award and won a Bullhorn Award in 2021.

References

External links 
 at the Onassis Foundation
 on Trax.fm by PRX

Audio podcasts
2021 podcast debuts
Scripted podcasts
American podcasts